North Bali International Airport (commonly abbreviated as "NBIA"), is a proposed airport on the island of Bali, Indonesia, located at Kubutambahan, in the kabupaten (regency) of Buleleng. It is a project initiated by the Governor of Bali, Made Mangku Pastika, on 9 July 2015.

Airport 
With a capacity of 32 million passengers, NBIA will be Indonesia's second largest airport. Built entirely on the sea, the site will be divided into two parts: the Aerotropolis and the airport. The latter will consist of a main terminal and three boarding satellites, and will have two parallel runways, a heliport and a seaport. The site will also include a cargo terminal and maintenance area.

Planning

The beginnings 
The Ministry of National Development Planning has included in its PPP Book 2013 (Public - Private Partnerships), a programme for the development of a new airport in North Bali under project code D-001-10-004.

This project consists of relieving congestion at Ngurah Rai International Airport. Bali Province is one of Indonesia's largest tourist attractions. The only airport, located in the South, welcomed nearly 20 million passengers in 2017 and is expected to grow by 8% the following year. The Local Government considers that a new airport will reduce traffic congestion in Denpasar municipality and Nusa Dua district.

Year 2015 
After studying several concepts, the Governor of Bali selected an airport at sea project in his letter of recommendation No. 553/11583/DPIK of 9 July 2015.

This project proposes to develop a THKON Aerotropolis in Kubutambahan in the Buleleng Regency. THKON comes from the term Tri Hita Karana. It is a new urban development strategy in accordance with an ancient Balinese tradition based on quality of life.

Year 2018 
The project of construction on the sea was the culmination of many political debates which led to an extension of the feasibility studies. The subject of the debates is equity between North and South Bali. The Governor asks for a balance in the development plan of the two zones.

In March 2018, the Coordinating Minister of Maritime Affairs, Luhut Panjaitan, gave the go-ahead for a feasibility study at the chosen location.

At the same time, expansion of the existing airport as well as transport links between the north and the south of the island are being prioritised by the Transport Minister, Budi Karya Sumadi.

See also 
Jembrana City International Airport

References 

Airports in Bali
Proposed airports in Indonesia